The 1958–59 Israel State Cup (Gvia HaMedina) was the 21st season of Israel's nationwide football cup competition and the sixth after the Israeli Declaration of Independence.

The competition began on 6 December 1958, with 136 Liga Gimel teams competing at the first round. Further rounds, until round 5 were played during the remainder of the 1958–59 season. Liga Lemuit teams entered the competition on the sixth round, on 12 September 1959.

The final was held at the Ramat Gan Stadium on 19 November 1959. Maccabi Tel Aviv defeated Hapoel Petah Tikva 4–3, after leading 4–0, and almost losing the advantage during the last ten minutes of the match. The result gave Maccabi Tel Aviv its second consecutive cup and 10th cup overall.

Results

First round
The teams were divided into regions, corresponding with Liga Gimel and Liga Dalet divisions.

Known results:

Replays

Second round
As in the first round, the second round matches were regionalized.

Known results:

Third Round
Liga Bet teams joined the competition. The draw, in which the 27 matches of the round was set, was unseeded and wasn't regionalized. Only 17 matches were played, with the remaining ten matches given as a walkover victory either due to away teams failing to appear to the match or due to home teams not sending referee invitations to the IFA.

Fourth round

Bye: Maccabi Jerusalem, Hapoel Burgata

Replays

Fifth round
An intermediate round, intended to leave 16 teams advancing to the sixth round. 10 of the remaining 21 teams played each other, with the rest receiving a bye to the next round.

Sixth round

Replay

Seventh round

Quarter-finals

Semi-finals

Final

References
100 Years of Football 1906-2006, Elisha Shohat (Israel), 2006

External links
 Israel Football Association website

Israel State Cup
State Cup
State Cup
Israel State Cup seasons